Stéphane Madeira (born 4 January 1994) is a French professional footballer who plays for Freamunde.

Club career
Madeira, only played in the reserve teams of Auxerre and couldn't break into the first team. In 2012, he joined Segunda Liga team Moreirense for a 3 year contract. On 2 January 2015, his contract was cancelled by mutual consent.

References

External links

1994 births
Footballers from Paris
Living people
Association football defenders
French footballers
French people of Portuguese descent
Moreirense F.C. players
Liga Portugal 2 players
G.D. Chaves players
U.D. Oliveirense players
S.C. Freamunde players